The Essential Elvis Presley is a greatest hits collection by American rock and roll musician Elvis Presley. The album was released as a two-disc set on January 2, 2007, by RCA Records as a part of Sony BMG's The Essential series and was later released by RCA and Legacy Recordings as a Limited Edition 3.0 three-disc set.

In the Netherlands the album was released as The Dutch Collection, which topped the albums chart in that country, while The Essential Elvis Presley topped the albums chart in Sweden. Although not as successful as other releases in The Essential series, the album was certified in several countries, including a Platinum certification in the US.

2007 CD Track listing

Disc 1 
"That's All Right"
"Baby, Let's Play House"
"Mystery Train"
"Heartbreak Hotel"
"I Was the One"
"Blue Suede Shoes"
"Hound Dog"
"Don't Be Cruel"
"Love Me Tender"
"All Shook Up"
"(There'll Be) Peace in the Valley (For Me)"
"Jailhouse Rock"
"Trouble"
"Fever"
"It's Now or Never"
"Reconsider Baby"
"Are You Lonesome Tonight?"
"Little Sister"
"Follow That Dream"
"Can't Help Falling in Love"

Disc 2 
"Return to Sender"
"Devil in Disguise"
"Viva Las Vegas"
"Bossa Nova Baby"
"Big Boss Man"
"A Little Less Conversation"
"If I Can Dream"
"Memories"
"In the Ghetto"
"Suspicious Minds"
"Don't Cry Daddy"
"Kentucky Rain"
"Polk Salad Annie"
"The Wonder of You"
"I Just Can't Help Believin"
"Burning Love"
"Always on My Mind"
"Steamroller Blues"
"Hurt"
"Moody Blue"

2008 Limited Edition 3.0 CD Track listing 

Discs 1 & 2 same as above

Disc 3 

Good Rockin' Tonight
(Let Me Be Your) Teddy Bear
King Creole 
Such A Night 
I Feel So Bad 
Guitar Man 
Only The Strong Survive 
You Don't Have To Say You Love Me

2015 Vinyl LP Track listing

Disc 1 
Side A
"That's All Right"
"Baby, Let's Play House"
"Mystery Train"
"Heartbreak Hotel"
"I Was the One"
"Blue Suede Shoes"
"Hound Dog"
"Don't Be Cruel"
"Love Me Tender"

Side B
"All Shook Up"
"Jailhouse Rock"
"Trouble"
"It's Now or Never"
"Are You Lonesome Tonight?"
"Little Sister"
"Follow That Dream"

Disc 2 
Side C
"Can't Help Falling in Love"
"Return to Sender"
"Devil in Disguise"
"Bossa Nova Baby"
"Viva Las Vegas"
"A Little Less Conversation"
"If I Can Dream"
Side D
"In the Ghetto"
"Suspicious Minds"
"Don't Cry Daddy"
"Kentucky Rain"
"Burning Love"

Charts

Weekly charts

Year-end charts

Certifications

References 

Elvis Presley compilation albums
2007 greatest hits albums
RCA Records compilation albums
Compilation albums published posthumously